Eunidia parastrigata is a species of beetle in the family Cerambycidae. It was described by Stephan von Breuning in 1978.

Subspecies
 Eunidia parastrigata girardi Breuning, 1981
 Eunidia parastrigata parastrigata Breuning, 1978

References

Eunidiini
Beetles described in 1978